Akpa (Akweya) is an Idomoid language  spoken in Ohimini and Oturkpo LGAs, Benue State, central Nigeria.

References

Idomoid languages